WYZT-LP (104.7 FM, "Crab Radio") is a radio station licensed to serve the community of Annapolis, Maryland. The station is owned by Maryland Hall for the Creative Arts, Inc and is jointly produced with the Anne Arundel County Public Schools. It airs a high school radio format.

The station was assigned the WYZT-LP call letters by the Federal Communications Commission on March 9, 2015.

References

External links
 Official Website
 

YZT-LP
YZT-LP
Radio stations established in 2017
2017 establishments in Maryland
High school radio stations in the United States
Anne Arundel County, Maryland